A  or  is a Japanese sword. The word is used in the West to refer to a specific type of Japanese straight, double-edged sword used in antiquity (as opposed to curved, single-edged swords such as the katana). In Japanese the term tsurugi or ken (:ja:剣) is used as a term for all sorts of international long, double-edged swords.

History
The term tsurugi (剣) designates a straight, double-edged, bladed weapon from Japan. It is a sword, which means that this weapon has two edges, one on each side of its blade, unlike the tachi, katana, wakizashi or odachi, which have only one cutting edge, on one of the two sides of the blade.

The oldest bronze sword excavated in Japan is a Chinese style dagger from around 800 BC in the Yayoi period (1000 BC – 300 AD). A large number of bronze tsurugi made around 200 B.C. in the Yayoi period were excavated from several sites, and it is thought that tsurugi were mass-produced in Japan in this period. Bronze tsurugi of this period were mainly used for religious services. The Yayoi period was the transition period from bronze to iron. However, the iron tsurugi were usually forged from the 5th century (Kofun period) to the 9th century (Heian period). 

From the 10th century, the development of the curved tachi began, from which the katana emerged. For a long time, tsurugi were made as weapons or for religious services, but before the 10th century, they completely disappeared as weapons and came to be made only as offerings to Shinto shrines and Buddhist temples. One of the most famous tsurugi is the one made in the Heian period (794－1185) owned by Kongō-ji and stored by Kyoto National Museum. It is made to imitate the sword Fudo Myōō holds in his right hand, and the hilt is in the shape of a vajra, a Buddhist altar tool.

Nowadays it is mainly associated with very remote historical times, as well as legends and mythology. There are some similarities with some variants of Chinese Jian (called Chugokuken (中国剣) in Japanese).

Kusanagi-no-Tsurugi

The most famous example is the legendary sword "Kusanagi-no-Tsurugi" which is one of the Three Imperial Regalia of Japan.

Tsurugi-tachi
The Tsurugi-tachi -剣太刀, a straight sword with only one side of the blade sharpened throughout, was similar to the Tsurugi or Ken. The other (back) side was only worked into a second cutting edge in the front part near the tip.

Literature
 Toshiro Suga: Ken, die Wurzeln des Aikido / Ken, les racines de l'Aïkido von Toshiro Suga (DVD). Hagenow Ondefo-Verl., 2006, ISBN 978-3-939703-40-2.

See also
 Japanese sword mountings

References

Ancient swords of Japan
Japanese swords